Dotie Joseph is a Democratic member of the Florida Legislature representing the State's 108th House district.

Joseph was born in Haiti and moved to Florida in 1982; she currently resides in North Miami.

Education
Dotie Joseph attended Miami-Dade public schools—including Lakeview Elementary, fine arts magnet programs at and Charles Drew Elementary and Miami Norland Middle School, and Design and Architecture Senior High (DASH). Joseph went on to graduate from Yale University with a degree in Political Sciences, earned a Juris Doctor from Georgetown University Law Center. Joseph also studied abroad in France with Columbia University in Paris, and with the Institute for International Mediation and Conflict Resolution in The Hague in the Netherlands.

Career
Joseph has worked as a federal judicial law clerk, legal consultant, a government and civil rights lawyer in the public and private sector. She is currently an attorney with Ottinot Law, an all-Black law firm which specializes in complex government and business matters.

Joseph won the election for Florida's House of Representatives on November 6, 2018, from the platform of Democratic Party. She secured 92% of the vote while her closest rival, Riquet Caballero, an LPF candidate, secured eight percent.

References

Joseph, Dotie
Living people
21st-century American politicians
21st-century American women politicians
Women state legislators in Florida
1979 births